Mark Durie (born 1958) is an Australian Anglican priest and a scholar in linguistics and theology. He is the founding director of the Institute for Spiritual Awareness, a Fellow at the Middle East Forum, and a senior research fellow of the Arthur Jeffery Centre for the Study of Islam at the Melbourne School of Theology.

Life and career
Durie was born in Papua to missionary parents, and grew up in Canberra. 

Mark Durie was awarded a PhD by the Australian National University in 1984. Subsequently he held visiting appointments at the University of Leiden, Massachusetts Institute of Technology, the University of California, Los Angeles, Stanford University and the University of California, Santa Cruz. From 1987 to 1997 he held positions of postdoctoral fellow, lecturer, senior lecturer, reader and associate professor at the University of Melbourne. Ordained an Anglican deacon and priest in 1999, he has served on the staff of St Mark's Camberwell, St Hilary's Kew, St Mary's Caulfield, St Clement's Elsternwick and St Catharine's South Caulfield. He holds a BTh (Hons), and DipTh from the Australian College of Theology and in 2016 completed a Th.D. with the Australian College of Theology and Melbourne School of Theology.

Durie has published articles and books on the Acehnese language of Aceh, Indonesia, linguistics, the genesis of the Quran and interfaith relations. He was elected to the Australian Academy of the Humanities in 1992. He has been described as "the most accomplished specialist on Acehnese writing in English".

His book The Third Choice: Islam, Dhimmitude and Freedom has a foreword by Bat Ye'or, and Durie has been described as a proponent of Ye'or's counter-jihadist worldview. 

He has appeared on Sky News Australia.

Works

Journal articles
Durie, Mark. "The So-Called Passive of Acehnese." Language. Linguistic Society of America, Vol. 64, No. 1 (Mar., 1988), pp. 104–113 - Available at Jstor: https://www.jstor.org/stable/414788
 "(Verhandelingen van het Koninklijk Instituut voor Taal-, Land- en Volkenkunde)." Foris Publications, 1985. , .
Durie, Mark. "Proto-Chamic and Acehnese mid vowels : towards Proto-Aceh-Chamic." 1988. (Archive)
Durie, Mark. "Control and decontrol in acehnese." Australian Journal of Linguistics. Volume 5, Issue 1, 1985. p. 43-53. Published online: 14 August 2008. DOI:10.1080/07268608508599335.
Durie, Mark. "Grammatical Relations in Acehnese." Studies in Language, 1987. vol. 11, no2, pp. 365–399. ISSN 0378-4177. DOI 10.1075/sl.11.2.05dur.

Books
Daud, Bukhari and Mark Durie. Kamus bahasa Aceh (Volume 151 of Pacific linguistics). Pacific Linguistics, Research School of Pacific and Asian Studies, Australian National University, 1999. , 9780858835061.
The Third Choice: Islam, Dhimmitude and Freedom. Deror Books, 2010.

Opinion articles
Creed of the Sword. The Australian. 23 September 2006.
Do Christians and Muslims worship the same God? 
From Broken Hill to Martin Place: Individual Jihad Comes to Australia, 1915 to 2015

References

External links
Mark Durie's Website
 OLAC resources in and about the Achinese language - Open Language Archives Community
 "Christianity: Will the REAL Religion of Peace please step forward!" - PRODOS Worldwide

Living people
Linguists from Australia
Australian Christian theologians
Australian critics of Islam
Counter-jihad activists
Harkness Fellows
Fellows of the Australian Academy of the Humanities
Recipients of the Centenary Medal
Australian National University alumni
Australian Anglican priests
1958 births
People from Canberra
Australian College of Theology alumni
Academic staff of the University of Melbourne